Radoslav Rančík (born 6 October 1979) is a Slovak retired professional basketball player.

Professional career
Rančík started his career with Istra Pula in Croatia. He then played in France. After joining the Czech club ČEZ Nymburk, he went on to play at Benetton Treviso, Galatasaray Istanbul, Azovmash Mariupol, and Inter Bratislava, before moving back to ČEZ Nymburk. He played with several teams in the European-wide 2nd-tier level EuroCup competition.

National team career
Rančík has been a member of the senior Slovak national basketball team. He played at the 2019 FIBA World Cup qualification.

Personal life
Rančík's older brother, Martin Rančík, is also a former professional basketball player.

References

External links
FIBA Profile
FIBA Europe Profile
EuroCup Profile
Eurobasket.com Profile
Italian League Profile 

1979 births
Living people
BC Azovmash players
Basketball Nymburk players
Galatasaray S.K. (men's basketball) players
Limoges CSP players
Pallacanestro Treviso players
Paris Racing Basket players
Power forwards (basketball)
Slovak men's basketball players
Slovak expatriate basketball people in France
Slovak expatriate basketball people in Turkey
Slovak expatriate basketball people in the United States
St. Cloud State Huskies men's basketball players
Sportspeople from Košice